Percival Mitchell Hornibrook (27 July 1899 – 25 August 1976) was an Australian cricketer who played in six Test matches from 1929 to 1930.

Career
Hornibrook made his first class debut in 1919–20 against Victoria, taking four wickets.

In 1920–21 he took 3–89 for Queensland against the touring English side.

He was selected for the Australian side which toured New Zealand in 1921 and took 47 first class wickets at an average of 12. According to Wisden, "Many thought he should have been included in the 1921 side to England, which was distinctly weak in slow-wicket bowling, though in the event it not require it."

Wisden later said "There was far greater surprise when he was omitted from the 1926 side, and no less a judge than M. A. Noble advocated his inclusion. He would at least have saved Macartney from being bowled to death in the early weeks of the tour and in the vital last Test on a rain-affected pitch he might easily have tipped the scales in Australia's favour."

Hornibrook made his test debut in the last game of the 1928–29 Ashes. He took four wickets and made some useful runs in Australia's victory.

In 1929–30 he took 35 first class wickets at an average of 32.

1930 Ashes
Hornibrook toured England for the 1930 Ashes. He played in all the tests and took 13 wickets in tests. He took 96 wickets on the tour in all, Australia's second best bowler after Clarrie Grimmett.

Hornibrook's best performance came in the 5th test. The series was 1–1, with England only having to draw to retain the Ashes. They batted first and scored 405, with Hornibrook taking no wickets. Australia batted and made 695. When England batted again Hornibrook took 7–92 and England were dismissed for 251.

According to Wisden, "his figures suggest, what good critics confirm, that he bowled far too many bad balls: one indeed said that bogey for a good slow left-hander on that wicket would have been seven for 30. Perhaps had he had longer experience of English conditions he would have been better. At any rate by then he was past his peak—his arm had dropped and he was more full-chested. At the end of the tour he retired from first-class cricket."

He played one Sheffield Shield game in 1930–31 and made a comeback to first class cricket in 1933–34. It was not successful but he continued to play club cricket for Toombul District Cricket Club.

Hornibrook retired from club cricket in 1940.

References

External links

1899 births
1976 deaths
Australia Test cricketers
Queensland cricketers
Australian cricketers
Cricketers from Queensland
People from the Sunshine Coast, Queensland